This article provides an alphabetical list of Bengali language authors. For a chronological list, see List of Bengali language authors.

Pre-partition Bengal

A 
Abdul Hakim (1620–1690)
Afzal Ali (16th-century)
Alaol (1606–1680)
Akkhoykumar Boral (1860–1919)

B 
Bankim Chandra Chattopadhyay (1838–94)
Bharatchandra Ray (1712–60)
Begum Rokeya (1880–1932)

D 
Daulat Qazi (1600–1638)
Dawlat Wazir Bahram Khan (16th-century)
Dinesh Chandra Sen (1866–1939)
Dwijendralal Ray (1863–1913)

E 
Ekramuddin Ahmad (1872–1940)
Eyakub Ali Chowdhury (1888–1940)

G 
Girish Chandra Ghosh (1844–1912)
Girish Chandra Sen (1835/36-1910)
Gobindachandra Das (1885–1918)

H 
Heyat Mahmud (1693–1760)

I 
Ismail Hossain Siraji (1880–1931)
Ishwar Chandra Gupta (1812–59)
Ishwar Chandra Vidyasagar (1820–91)

K 
Krittibas Ojha (1443-15??)

M 
Michael Madhusudan Dutt (1824–73)
Mohammad Lutfur Rahman (1889–1936)
Muhammad Muqim (18th-century)

N 
Nabinchandra Sen (1847–1909)
Nur Qutb Alam (died 1416)

P 
Pramatha Chowdhury (1868–1946)
Prabhat Kumar Mukhopadhyay (1873-1932)

R 
Rabindranath Tagore (1861–1941)
Rahimunnessa (1763–1800)
Rajanikanta Sen (1865 - 1910)

S 
Sarasibala Basu (1886–1929)
Satyendranath Dutta (1882–1922)
Satyendranath Tagore (1842–1923)
Shah Muhammad Saghir (14th-century)
Sharat Chandra Chattopadhyay (1876–1938)
Sheikh Fazlul Karim (1882–1936)
Sukumar Ray (1887–1923)
Swami Nigamananda (1880–1935)
Swami Vivekananda (1863–1902)
 Swarnakumari Devi, (1855–1932)
Syed Sultan (1550–1648)

T 
Troilokyanath Mukhopadhyay (1847–1919)

U 
Upendrakishore Ray (1863–1915)

Z 
Zainuddin (15th-century)

West Bengal

A 
Abanindranath Tagore (1871–1951)
Abul Bashar (b. 1951)
Achintyakumar Sengupta (1903–76)
Amiya Bhushan Majumdar (1918–2001)
Amiya Chakravarty (1901–86)
Anil Ghorai (b. 1957)
Annadashankar Roy (1904–2002)
Arun Mitra (1909–2000)
Ashapoorna Devi (1909–95)
Ashutosh Mukherjee (1920–89)
Atin Bandyopadhyay (1934–2019)

B 
Balai Chand Mukhopadhyay (1899–1979)
Bani Basu (b. 1939)
Bibhutibhushan Bandopadhyay (1894–1950)
Bibhutibhushan Mukhopadhyay (1894–1987)
Bijon Bhattacharya (1917–78)
Bimal Kar (1921-2002)
Bimal Mitra (1912–91)
Binoy Majumdar (1934–2006)
Bishnu Dey (1909–82)
Buddhadeb Bosu (1908–74)
Buddhadeb Guha (b. 1936)

D 
Dakshinaranjan Mitra Majumder (1877–1957)
Dibyendu Palit (b. 1939)
Dinesh Das (1913–85)

E 
Ekram Ali (b. 1950)

H 
Hemendrakumar Roy (1888–1963)

J 
Jagadish Gupta (1886–1957)
Jatindramohan Bagchi (1878–1948)
Jatindranath Sengupta (1880–1954)
Jibanananda Das (1899–1954)
Joy Goswami (b. 1954)

K 
Kalidas Roy (1889–1975)
Kamal Kumar Majumdar (1914–79)
Kamini Roy (1864–1933)
Kumud Ranjan Mullick (1883–1970)

L 
Leela Majumdar (1908–2007)

M 
Mahasweta Devi (b. 1926)
Malay Roy Choudhury (b. 1939)
Mani Shankar Mukherjee (b. 1933)
Manik Bandopadhyay (1908–56)
Mohit Chattopadhyay (b. 1934)
Moniruddin Khan (b. 1974)
Moti Nandi (1931–2010)
Mohitolal Majumdar (1888–1952)
 Maniklal Sinha (1916-1994)

N 
Nabanita Dev Sen (b. 1938)
Nabarun Bhattacharya(1948-2014)
Narayan Debnath (b. 1926)
Narayan Gangopadhyay (1918–70)
Narayan Sanyal (1924–2005)
Narendranath Mitra (1916–75)
Nihar Ranjan Gupta (1911–86)
Nirad C. Chaudhuri (1897–1999)
Nirupama Devi (1883-1951)

P 
Prabir Ghosh (b. 1945)
Prabhat Ranjan Sarkar (1921–1990)
Premendra Mitra (1904–88)
Priyanath Mukhopadhyay (1855–1947)
Protiva Bose (1915–2006)

R 
Rajsekhar Bose (1880–1960)

S 
Sachin Sengupta (1891–1961)
Samaresh Majumdar (b. 1944)
Samir Roychoudhury (b. 1933)
Sandipan Chattopadhyay (1933–2005)
Sanjib Chattopadhyay (b. 1936)
Satyajit Ray (1921–92)
Shamik Ghosh (b. 1983)
Shankha Ghosh (1932–2021)
Shakti Chattopadhyay (1933–95)
Shaktipada Rajguru (b. 1922)
Sharadindu Bandyopadhyay (1899–1970)
Shibram Chakraborty (1902–80)
Shirshendu Mukhopadhyay (b. 1935)
Subhas Mukhopadhyay (1919–2003)
Subodh Ghosh (1909–80)
Sudhindranath Dutta (1901–1960)
 Sudhir Chakravarti (1934-2020) 
Sukanta Bhattacharya (1926–47)
Sukumar Sen (1900–92)
Sunil Gangopadhyay (1934–2012)
Syed Kawsar Jamal (b. 1950)
Syed Mustafa Siraj (b. 1930)

T 
Tarapada Roy (b. 1936)
Tarashankar Bandopadhyaya (1898–1971)

U 
Utpal Dutt (1929–93)

Bangladesh

A 
Abdullah Abu Sayeed (b. 1939)
Abdullah-Al-Muti (1930–1998)
Abdul Gaffar Choudhury (b. 1934)
Abdul Mannan Syed (b. 1943)
Abdul Kadir (1906–84)
Abdul Karim Sahitya Bisharad (1869–1953)
Abdur Rouf Choudhury (1929–1996)
Abu Ishaque (1926–2003)
Abu Rushd
Abubakar Siddique (b. 1936)
Abujafar Shamsuddin (1911–89)
Abul Kashem (1920–1991)
Abul Mansur Ahmed (1898–1979)
Ahmed Sharif (1921–1999)
Ahmed Sofa (1943–2001)
Ahsan Habib (1917–1985)
Ahsan Habib (cartoonist)
Akhteruzzaman Elias (1943–97)
Akbar Hussain (1917–1980)
Alauddin Al-Azad (b. 1932)
Al Mahmud
Ali Imam
Anwar Pasha (1928–1971)
Anisul Hoque (b. 1965)
Aroj Ali Matubbar
Asad Chowdhury
A. T. M. Shamsuddin

B 
Baby Halder (b. 1973)
Bande Ali Mia (1906–82)
Bashir Al Helal (b. 1936)
Benojir Ahmed (1903–1983)
Bipradash Barua (b. 1940)

D 
Datta, Haripada (b. 1947)
Dewan Mohammad Azraf (1908–1999)
Dilara Hashem (b. 1936)

E 
Ekhlasuddin Ahmed (b. 1940)

F 
Farrukh Ahmed

G 
Golam Mostofa (1897–1964)
Nirmalendu Goon

H 
Hasan Azizul Huq (b. 1939)
Hasnat Abdul Hye (b. 1939)
Humayun Ahmed (b. 1948)
Humayun Azad (1947–2004)

I 
Imdadul Haq Milon (b. 1955)

J 
Jagadish Gupta (1886–1957)
Jahanara Imam (1929–1994)
Jasimuddin
Jatin Sarker (b. 1936)

K 
Kazi Abdul Odud (1894–1970)
Kazi Nazrul Islam (1898–1976)
Khondakar Ashraf Hossain

M 
Mahbubul Alam (1898–1981)
Mahbub Ul Alam Choudhury (b. 1927)
Mir Mosharraf Hossain
Mohammad Barkatullah (1898–1974)
Mohammad Nurul Huda (b. 1949)
Mohammad Rafiq (b. 1943)
Moinul Ahsan Saber (b. 1958)
Mokbula Manzoor (b. 1938)
Motaher Hussain Chowdhury (1903–1956)
Muhammad Mohar Ali (1932–2007)
M. R. Akhtar Mukul (1929–2004)
Mufazzal Haider Chaudhury (1926–1971)
Muhammad Asadullah Al-Ghalib (b. 1948)
Muhammad Habibur Rahman (b. 1935)
Muhammad Shahidullah (1885–1969)
Muhammed Zafar Iqbal (b. 1952)
Munier Chowdhury (1925–1971)
Muntasir Mamun

N 
Nurul Momen (Sobriquet:- Natyaguru) (1908–1990)
Nasreen Jahan (b. 1964)
Nilima Ibrahim (1921–2002)

Q 
Qazi Anwar Hussain
Qazi Imdadul Haq
Qazi Motahar Hossain (1897–1981)
Qazi Nazrul Islam

R 
Rabeya Khatun (b. 1935)
Rafiq Azad
Rahat Khan (b. 1940)
Rakib Hasan
Rashid Askari (b.1965)
Rashid Haider
Rashid Karim (b. 1925)
Razia Khan
Rezauddin Stalin
Rizia Rahman(b. 1939)
Romena Afaz (1926 - 2003)
Rudra Mohammad Shahidullah (1956–1992)

S 
Salimullah Khan
Sardar Fazlul Karim
Sarder Jayenuddin (1918–1986)
Selim Al-Deen (1949–2008)
Selina Hossain (b. 1947)
Sezan Mahmud (b. 1967)("NC 1988")
Sen, Satyen (1907–81)
Shah Muhammad Sagir (?)
Shahadat Hussain (1893–1953)
Shahed Ali (b. 1925)
Shahid Akhand (b. 1935)
Shahidul Zahir (1953–2008)
Shahidullah Kaiser (1926–1971)
Shahriyar Kabir
Shamsuddin Abul Kalam (1926–97)
Shamsunnahar Mahmud (1908–1964)
Shamsur Rahman
Shaukat Osman (1917–98)
Sirajul Islam Chowdhury
Sufia Kamal (1911–99)
Syed Ali Ahsan
Syed Abul Maksud
Syed Emdad Ali (1880–1956)
Syed Manzoorul Islam
Syed Mujtaba Ali (1904–74)
Syed Shamsul Haque (1934)
Syed Waliullah (1922–71)

T 
Tahmima Anam (b. 1975)
Taslima Nasrin (b. 1962)

W 
 Wasi Ahmed (b. 1954)

Z 
Zahir Raihan (1935–1972)

References

Bengali